Esquimaux Management (or Eskvímó) was an Icelandic independent record label created around 1981 by renowned composer Hilmar Örn Hilmarsson and Gunnar Ruðni Agnarsson, manager of new wave band Þeyr.
The company was in charge of the release of Þeyr’s records and books. Its owners performed with British bands in Iceland such as Eyless in Gaza.

Esquimaux cease operations in 1983 with the breakup of Þeyr. In 2001 the name of the company appeared in Mjötviður til Fóta, Þeyr’s 20th anniversary album. This was in order to reflect management's role in the history of the band. The commemorative album was produced under the direction of former Þeyr members and friends.

Þeyr releases through Esquimaux

See also 
 List of record labels

External links

Page of HÖH at Rate Your Music.com
Intravenous.de - Page about Icelandic music. It includes a section for Hilmar Ö. Hilmarsson and Þeyr.
Page about Þeyr
Website about the history and discography of Þeyr
Page about Þeyr at Tónlist.is - It includes mp3 samples (in Icelandic).
Official site of Guðlaugur Kristinn Óttarsson - Þeyr guitarist.
Official site of Sigtryggur Baldursson - Þeyr drummer.

Icelandic independent record labels
Record labels established in 1981
Record labels disestablished in 1983
1981 establishments in Iceland
1983 disestablishments in Iceland